The masked julie (Julidochromis transcriptus) is a species of cichlid endemic to Lake Tanganyika in Africa where it is found only along the northwestern shore preferring areas with rocky substrates.  They eat zooplankton and benthic invertebrates found in the algae growth in the wild.  This species reaches a length of  TL.

See also
List of freshwater aquarium fish species

References

masked julie
Fish described in 1959
Taxa named by Hubert Matthes
Taxonomy articles created by Polbot